Return to Eden may refer to:
 Return to Eden, a 1983 Australian miniseries and subsequent 1986 weekly series
 Return to Eden (Timo Tolkki's Avalon album), 2019
 Return to Eden, Vol. 1: The Early Recordings, an album by All About Eve
 Return to Eden (novel) by Harry Harrison
 Return to Eden (game), the second game in the Silicon Dreams trilogy
 Return to Eden, a book by English author Rosalind Miles